Lalleshwari, also known locally as Lal Ded (1320–1392), was a  Kashmiri mystic of the Kashmir Shaivism school of Hindu philosophy. She was the creator of the style of mystic poetry called vatsun or Vakhs, literally "speech" (from Sanskrit vaak). Known as Lal Vakhs, her verses are the earliest compositions in the Kashmiri language and are an important part in the history of modern Kashmiri literature. 

Lal Ded ("Mother Lal" or "Mother Lalla") is also known by various other names, including Lal Dyad (Dyad means "Grandmother"), Lalla Aarifa, Lal Diddi, Lalleshwari, Lalla Yogishwari/Yogeshwari and Lalishri.

Life 
A great deal of the records of Lal Ded's life are contained in oral tradition, and consequently there is considerable variance on the details of her life and beliefs. Numerous contemporary Kashmiri histories, such as those prepared by Jonaraja, Srivara, Prajyabhatta, and Haidar Malik Chadura, do not mention Lal Ded. The first written record of Lal Ded's life is contained in the Tadhkirat-ul-Arifin (1587), a collection of biographies of saints and religious figures written by Mulla Ali Raina, and followed by an account of her life in Baba Daud Mishkati's Asrar ul-Akbar (1654). In these texts, Lal Ded is described as a mystic saint, appearing in the forest to travellers. In 1736, Khwaja Azam Diddamari's Tarikh-i-Azami contained a more detailed account of Lal Ded's life. She is also noted in a Persian chronicle, the Waqiati-e-Kashmir (1746) in which she is described as being famous in the reign of Sultan Alau-ud-din (1343–54) and died in the reign of Sultan Shihab-ud-din (1354–73).

Lal Ded is also believed to be a contemporary of Mir Sayyid Ali-Hamdani, an Iranian Sufi scholar and poet, who recorded stories of her in his own verse during his travels to Kashmir.

Most modern scholars place Lal Ded's birth between 1301 and 1320 C.E., near Sempore or Pandrenthan. She is estimated to have died in 1373, and a grave near Bijbehara is commonly attributed to her, although there is no confirmation. Lal Ded is believed to have been born to a Brahmin family, and was married at the age of twelve in accordance with the local customs. Following her marriage, she was renamed, as is custom, to Padmavati, but continued to be known as Lalla or Lal Ded. Some reports suggest her marriage was unhappy, and that she left home, between the ages of twenty-four and twenty-six, to become a disciple of a spiritual leader, Siddha Srikanth or Sed Boyu, who was a Shaivite. As part of her religious education, she travelled alone on foot, surviving on alms, before becoming a teacher and spiritual leader herself.

Literary works 
Lal Ded's poems represent some of the earliest known works of Kashmiri literature, and were written as Kashmiri began to emerge as a distinct language from Apabhramsa-prakrit, which was spoken in North India. A total of 285 poems, known as vakhs, are attributed to Lal Ded.

Themes 
Lal Ded's vakhs drawn from influences and languages that made contact with the Indian sub-continent in her life, drawing from Sanskritic, Islamic, Sufi, and Sikh cultures.

She continued the mystic tradition of Shaivism in Kashmir, which was known as Trika before 1900.

Translations 
Lal Ded's works were first recorded in writing in the twentieth century, and have been frequently republished since, in Kashmiri as well as in translation. In 1914, Sir George Grierson, a civil servant and the Superintendent of the Linguistic Survey of India, commissioned a copy of Lal Ded's vakhs. A written record of the vakhs was unavailable at the time, and one was prepared by transcribing an oral narration of the vakhs performed by Dharma-dasa Darwesh, a story-teller residing in Gush, Kashmir. This manuscript was translated in English by Grierson and published as Lalla-Vakyani, or The Wise Sayings of Lal Ded. Grierson consolidated and expanded on the partial translation prepared by the Hungarian-British archaeologist and scholar Sir Marc Aurel Stein, and incorporated some archived poems that were contained in the Dictionary of Kashmiri Proverbs and Sayings (1888).

Grierson's translation was the first printed and published volume of Lal Ded's works. Following his translation, a number of English translations have been produced, notably those by Pandit Ananda Koul (1921), Sir Richard Carnac Temple (1924) and Jaylal Kaul (1973). More recent translations include those by Coleman Barks, Jaishree Odin Kak, and Ranjit Hoskote.

Her poems, (vakhs) have been translated into English by Richard Temple, Jaylal Kaul, Coleman Barks, Jaishree Odin, and Ranjit Hoskote.

Legacy 
The leading Kashmiri Sufi figure Sheikh Noor-ud-din Wali (also known as Nooruddin Rishi or Nunda Rishi) was highly influenced by Lal Ded. He ultimately led to the formation of the Rishi order of saints and later gave rise to many Rishi saints like Resh Mir Sàeb. One Kashmiri folk story recounts that, as a baby, Nunda Rishi refused to be breast-fed by his mother. It was Lal Ded who breast-fed him.

Lal Ded and her mystic musings continue to have a deep impact on the psyche of Kashmiris, and the 2000 National Seminar on her held at New Delhi led to the release of the book Remembering Lal Ded in Modern Times. In his book "Triadic Mysticism", Paul E. Murphy calls her the "chief exponent of devotional or emotion-oriented Triadism". According to him, three significant representatives of devotionalism emerged in Kashmir in the five hundred years between the last half of the ninth and the end of the fourteenth centuries.

What this points to is the non-sectarian nature of Lal Ded's spiritual life and her song-poems. Yet, her life and work have been used for various religious and political agendas over time. As author and poet Ranjit Hoskote writes:

Beyond several new translations of Lal Ded's vakh, there are other contemporary performative arts that are based on Lal Ded's life and poetry. For example, there are contemporary renderings of Lal Ded's poetry in song. In addition, a solo play in English, Hindi, and Kashmiri titled Lal Ded (based on her life) has been performed by actress Mita Vashisht across India since 2004.

Further reading
 Lalla Yogishwari, Anand Kaul, reprint from the Indian Antiquary, Vols. L, LIX, LX, LXI, LXII.
 Lalla-Vakyani, Sir George Grierson and Dr. Lionel D. Barnett Litt. D. (R. A. S. monograph, Vol. XVII, London 1920)..
 Vaakh Lalla Ishwari, Parts I and II (Urdu Edition by A. K. Wanchoo and English by Sarwanand Chaaragi, 1939).
 Lal Ded by Jayalal Kaul, 1973, Sahitya Akademi, New Delhi.
 The Ascent of Self: A Reinterpretation of the Mystical Poetry of Lalla-Ded by B. N. Parimoo, Motilal Banarsidass, Delhi. .
 The Word of Lalla the Prophetess, by Sir Richard Carnac Temple, Cambridge 1924
 Lal Ded: Her life and sayings by Nil Kanth Kotru, Utpal publications, Srinagar, .
 Lalleshwari : spiritual poems by a great Siddha yogini, by Swami Muktananda and Swami Laldyada. 1981, SYDA Foundation, ASIN: B000M1C7BC.
 Lal Ded: Her life & sayings, by Swami Laldyada. Utpal Publications, 1989, .
 Naked Song, by Laldyada, Lalla, Coleman Barks (Translator), 1992, Maypop Books, . 
 Mystical Verses of Lalla: A Journey of Self Realization, by Jaishree Kak. Motilal Banarsidass, 2007.
 I, Lalla: The Poems of Lal Ded, translated by Ranjit Hoskote with an Introduction and Notes, Penguin Classics, 2011, . 
 Siddha Yogini, A Kashmiri Secret of Divine Knowledge. by Ghauri, Laila Khalid. Proquest Dissertations And Theses 2012. Section 0075, Part 0604 82 pages; [M.A dissertation].United States – District of Columbia: The George Washington University; 2012. Publication Number: AAT 1501080.
 Lalla, Unveiled: The Naked Voice of the Feminine Translations by Jennifer Sundeen. 2nd Tier Publishing, July 3, 2020.' .

See also
Habba Khatoon
Nund Rishi
Hamza Makhdoom
Rishi order

References

External links

 Kashmiri Saints and Sages
 The Wise Sayings of Lal Ded, translated by Sir George Grierson

Hindu female religious leaders
Hindu mystics
Kashmiri Shaivites
Hindu poets
Kashmiri poets
Indian women poets
1320 births
1392 deaths
14th-century Indian poets
14th-century Indian women writers
14th-century Indian writers
Women mystics